The San Angelo Stampede Express was a professional indoor football team from San Angelo, Texas owned by Darlene Jones. They were announced as a charter member of the Lone Star Football League but folded before play began in 2012. They played their home games in the Foster Communications Coliseum. They changed their name from the San Angelo Stampede for the 2006 season.

Season-by-season 

|-
| colspan="6" style="text-align:center;"| San Angelo Stampede (Intense Football League)
|-
|2004 || 9 || 7 || 0 || 4th League || Lost Semifinal (Amarillo)
|-
| colspan="6" style="text-align:center;"| San Angelo Stampede (NIFL)
|-
|2005 || 2 || 11 || 0 || 3rd Pacific Central || --
|-
| colspan="6" style="text-align:center;"| San Angelo Stampede Express (Intense Football League)
|-
|2006 || 3 || 11 || 0 || 5th League || --
|-
|2007 || 4 || 10 || 0 || 6th League || --
|-
|2008 || 5 || 9 || 0 || 8th League || --
|-
| colspan="6" style="text-align:center;"| San Angelo Stampede Express (Indoor Football League)
|-
|2009 || 5 || 9 || 0 || 3rd Intense Lone Star || Won Divisionals I (Abilene)Lost Divisionals II (El Paso)
|-
|2010 || 10 || 4 || 0 || 2nd Intense Lonestar East || Won Divisionals I (Fairbanks)Lost Divisionals II (Billings)
|-
|2011 || colspan="6" style="text-align:center;"| Did Not Play
|-
| colspan="6" style="text-align:center;"| San Angelo Stampede Express (LSFL)
|-
|2012 || colspan="6" style="text-align:center;"| Did Not Play
|-
!Totals || 36 || 63 || 0
|colspan="2"| (including playoffs)

History

2003
On August 9, San Angelo confirmed that the Express would be a new expansion member of the Intense Football League.

2006 
Before the season began Owner Darlene Jones announced that the team's goal is to 
"Win Football Games!!". Jones made big changes with the announcement of new General Manager Bridget Jones and new head coach J. T. Smith. The team showcased new Home field uniforms.

2007 
In February the Stampede announced the hiring of former player Johnny Anderson. The team retired his number 6. On May 2 the Stampede's front office announced the suspension of Head Coach Johnny Anderson for 10 days. The reason for the suspension was Anderson was being investigated by the San Angelo Police Department regarding a physical assault on two women.

2009 
In 2009, former Texas Tech Quarterback Sonny Cumbie was named Head Coach and Director of Player Personnel to replace Jon Loudermilk. Cumbie was the 10th Head Coach named in the team's history. As a player, Cumbie had stints with the Indianapolis Colts, Baltimore Ravens and finally the Los Angeles Avengers of the Arena Football League (AFL). Four games into the 2009 Stampede Express season, Cumbie became the starting quarterback and lead the team to the playoffs for the first time in franchise history.

2010
Clint Dolezel, a 13-year veteran of the AFL, was named head coach and the team had their best season in franchise history with a 10–4 record. The Express lost in the conference semifinals to the Billings Outlaws. Running Back Derrick Ross was named Rookie of the Year and led the league in rushing yards as well as touchdowns.

Retired numbers 
 Johnny Anderson- # 6

Notable players
 Sonny Cumbie- Head Coach and QB
 Jonathan Hamm- Boxer and Actor
 Derrick Ross
 Edwin James- LB
 Mitch Ables - WR - Player - Coach - First Touchdown in San Angelo Stampede History
Trae Ivory - LB - IFL single game tackle record versus Odessa Roughnecks in April 2009.
Devin Livingston Center- 2009 IFL 1st team Center

References

External links
 San Angelo Stampede Express official website
 Stampede's 2005 Stats
 Stampede Express's 2006 Stats 
 Stampede Express's 2007 Stats 
 Stampede Express's 2008 Stats 
 Bridget's Boys A story about the arena football team and its future prospects

Defunct American football teams in Texas
Former Indoor Football League teams
Former Lone Star Football League teams
Intense Football League teams
Sports in San Angelo, Texas
American football teams established in 2003
American football teams disestablished in 2012
2003 establishments in Texas
2012 disestablishments in Texas